Anil Sharma is an Indian politician and a member of 18th & 17th Legislative Assembly of Uttar Pradesh of India. He represents the Shikarpur (Assembly constituency) in Bulandshahr district of Uttar Pradesh and is a member of the Bharatiya Janata Party. Currently he is serving as Minister of State for Forest, Environment, Zoological Garden in Government of Uttar Pradesh.

Early life and education
Sharma was born 26 June 1963 in Surjawali village Bulandshahr district of Uttar Pradesh to his father Vijay Kumar Sharma. In 1987, he married Moirta Sharma, they have one son and one daughter. He had completed Intermediate education from Board of High School and Intermediate Education Uttar Pradesh.

Political career
Sharma started his journey in politics from the village head (Pradhan). In 1989, Anil Sharma was elected unopposed village head of the ancestral village Surjawali for the first time. After that, he became the village head for the second consecutive time.

In 2002, Anil Sharma was elected MLA from Khurja Assembly seat on Bahujan Samaj Party ticket for the first time. Then for the second consecutive time in 2007, Anil Sharma became MLA from Khurja. In the year 2012, Khurja seat was secured. He contested on the Bahujan Samaj Party ticket from Shikarpur Assembly seat but lost to SP's Mukesh Sharma. In the year 2017, he was elected MLA from Shikarpur Assembly seat as a member of Bharatiya Janata Party.

Posts held

References

Uttar Pradesh MLAs 2017–2022
Bharatiya Janata Party politicians from Uttar Pradesh
Living people
1963 births
Uttar Pradesh MLAs 2022–2027